Eric Jevon England (born April 25, 1971) is a gridiron football player who plays defensive end.  He most recently played with the Toronto Argonauts of the Canadian Football League.  England also played in the National Football League, the XFL and the Arena Football League. Most recently, England was signed by the New York Sentinels of the UFL. He was later cut from the team.

High school years
England attended Willowridge High School in Houston, Texas and won numerous All-American honors, and as a senior, made eleven sacks and 162 tackles.

College career
The highlight of Eric's college career at Texas A&M was his selection to the All-Southwest Conference team as a junior.

Professional career
England played three years (1994 to 1996) with the Arizona Cardinals of the NFL, suiting up for 37 games. He played 12 games with the BC Lions of the CFL in 2000, and in 2001 he played in 7 games with the San Francisco Demons of the XFL. In 2002, he played with the Detroit Fury of the Arena Football League. In 2003, he played with the New York Dragons of the AFL, then in the same season joined Toronto of the CFL. He played with the Toronto Argonauts between 2003 and 2006 (56 total games). During his stint as an Argo, England was named an all star in 2003 & a Grey Cup champion in 2004.

References

1971 births
Living people
American football defensive ends
Canadian football defensive linemen
BC Lions players
Detroit Fury players
New York Dragons players
Phoenix Cardinals players
San Francisco Demons players
Texas A&M Aggies football players
Toronto Argonauts players
Sportspeople from Fort Wayne, Indiana
Players of American football from Houston
Players of Canadian football from Houston
African-American players of Canadian football
21st-century African-American sportspeople
20th-century African-American sportspeople
Players of American football from Fort Wayne, Indiana